Halvseint is an animated satirical chatshow that premièred on the Norwegian TV channel NRK1 in 2007. 
The show is hosted by Captain Felix (Rune Nilson) and his sidekick Amy (Ingrid Gjessing Linhave) who interview both known guests and fictional characters. Halvseint is the first animated series that NRK has produced. The first season constituted six 25 minute episodes and one Christmas special that aired on 24 December 2007. The second season started on 3 April 2008 and lasted four episodes.

Guest characters
 Heinrich Stammler, also known as "Mr. Party With Beer", is a man with short cut platinum-blond hair, speaking English with a strong German accent.
 Kurt Nilsen
 Ari Behn
 Imam Al Arian
 Lasse Laache
 Oddbjørn Grøde
 Siv Jensen
 Sissel Kyrkjebø
 Carl I. Hagen
 Jahn Teigen

Original creators 
 Mattis Folkestad (chief animator)
 Barbara Jahn
 Marius Hoel

Animators 
 Øyvind Tangseth
 Siv Nordsveen
 Pil Cappelen Smith
 Kristoffer Drageset
 Espen Alme Ellingsen
 Siren Halvorsen

External links
 NRK Halvseint English Page

2007 Norwegian television series debuts
Norwegian television talk shows
Norwegian animated television series
NRK original programming
2008 Norwegian television series endings
2000s Norwegian television series
2000s animated television series